Wairau Valley is a suburb of Auckland, New Zealand. The area is predominantly light industrial/commercial. The Northern Motorway passes to the east, and the Wairau Park shopping complex extends to the north. The valley is drained by the Wairau Creek, which flows on through Milford and discharges into the Hauraki Gulf from an estuary at the northern end of Milford Beach.

Demographics

Wairau Valley had a population of 204 at the 2018 New Zealand census, an increase of 36 people (21.4%) since the 2013 census, and an increase of 99 people (94.3%) since the 2006 census. There were 45 households, comprising 126 males and 78 females, giving a sex ratio of 1.62 males per female. The median age was 43.6 years (compared with 37.4 years nationally), with 27 people (13.2%) aged under 15 years, 45 (22.1%) aged 15 to 29, 114 (55.9%) aged 30 to 64, and 18 (8.8%) aged 65 or older.

Ethnicities were 63.2% European/Pākehā, 5.9% Māori, 5.9% Pacific peoples, 30.9% Asian, and 2.9% other ethnicities. People may identify with more than one ethnicity.

The percentage of people born overseas was 42.6, compared with 27.1% nationally.

Although some people chose not to answer the census's question about religious affiliation, 50.0% had no religion, 35.3% were Christian, 2.9% had Māori religious beliefs, 5.9% were Hindu, 1.5% were Muslim and 4.4% had other religions.

Of those at least 15 years old, 30 (16.9%) people had a bachelor's or higher degree, and 24 (13.6%) people had no formal qualifications. The median income was $34,700, compared with $31,800 nationally. 27 people (15.3%) earned over $70,000 compared to 17.2% nationally. The employment status of those at least 15 was that 102 (57.6%) people were employed full-time and 24 (13.6%) were part-time.

Education and recreation
Wairau Valley Special School is a coeducational special school, with a roll of  students as of  It caters for students up to 21 years old with intellectual disabilities. The North Shore Events Centre, an indoor arena, is in Wairau Valley.

Notes

Suburbs of Auckland
North Shore, New Zealand
Kaipātiki Local Board Area